The Communauté de communes de l'Est de la Somme is a communauté de communes in the Somme and Aisne départements and in the Hauts-de-France région of France. It was formed on 1 January 2017 by the merger of the former Communauté de communes du Pays Hamois and the Communauté de communes du Pays Neslois. It consists of 41 communes (one of which, Pithon, in Aisne), and its seat is in Ham. Its area is 264.6 km2, and its population was 20,301 in 2018.

Composition
The communauté de communes consists of the following 41 communes:

Organization

Administrative seat

Elected members 
The communauté de communes if administered by a conseil communautaire composed of 64 members prior to 2020 and 63 members since the 2020 French municipal elections. Seats are appropriated proportionally to individual communes, based upon their population as follows:

 11 delegates for Ham.
 6 delegates for Nesle.
 4 delegates for Eppeville.
 3 delegates for Hombleux.
 2 delegates for both Esmery-Hallon and Muille-Villette.
 1 delegate for each of the 35 remaining communes.

Presidents

References 

Est de la Somme
Est de la Somme
Est de la Somme